General G. W. Goethals may refer to:

People
George Washington Goethals (1858–1928), a United States Army officer and civil engineer

Ships
USS General G. W. Goethals (ID-1443), a United States Navy cargo ship and troop transport in commission in 1919